Matthew Wethers (born 30 May 1985) is a speedway rider from Australia.

Speedway career
He rode in the top tier of British Speedway riding for the Wolverhampton Wolves during the 2010 Elite League speedway season. He began his British career riding for Edinburgh Monarchs in 2003. He was part of the Newcastle Diamonds team that competes in the SGB Championship 2021.

References 

1985 births
Living people
Australian speedway riders
Edinburgh Monarchs riders
Wolverhampton Wolves riders